So Normal (Original Portuguese title: Os Normais) is a 2003 Brazilian film, based on the popular Brazilian sitcom of the same name.  The film shows the beginning of the relationship between the characters Rui and Vani. It was directed by José Alvarenga Jr. and starred Luiz Fernando Guimarães (Rui), Fernanda Torres (Vani), Marisa Orth (Marta), and Evandro Mesquita (Sergio).

A sequel, Os Normais 2, premiered in Brazil on August 27, 2009.

External links
 
 

2003 films
Brazilian comedy films
2000s Portuguese-language films